was a Japanese inventor who registered over 1,000 patents throughout the world, including patents for Caller-ID system and telephone answering machine. He patented his first telephone answering machine, the Ansa Fone, in Japan in 1954, followed by the United States in 1960. He patented Caller-ID in Japan in 1976, and received a United States patent in 1980. In 1983 he invented a digital telephone answering device.

He was a recipient of Japan's Medal of Honour, the Yellow Ribbon, and was designated as a Living National Treasure.

Hashimoto was awarded an honorary 'Doctor of Science' degree ('honoris causa') by New Jersey Institute of Technology in 1994 for his outstanding contributions to the field of telephony.

References
 "Phonetel: Dr. Kazuo Hashimoto’s legacy"
 "New Jersey Institute of Technology 2009 Commencement Ceremony Guide"

1995 deaths
Japanese inventors
Year of birth missing